Leandra Faye Little (born 8 November 1984) is an English former professional footballer who most recently played as a  defender for Sheffield United of the FA Women's Championship. A former PE teacher, she is the education lead at the Liverpool F.C. Women's Academy and an education welfare officer for The Football Association.

Basketball
Prior to her football career, Little represented the England women's national basketball team and played for the City of Sheffield Hatters from 2003 to 2007. Disappointed to be left off the longlist for the Great Britain women's national basketball team at the 2012 London Olympics, Little decided to play football instead.

Football
In 2007 Little joined Lincoln Ladies, becoming an important defender in the team which consistently challenged for promotion from the FA Women's Premier League Northern Division. When Lincoln were accepted into the FA WSL, Little performed well in the inaugural 2011 season, being named Manager's Player of the Year.

In December 2011, Little transferred to Lincoln's FA WSL rivals Doncaster Rovers Belles. In six years with the South Yorkshire outfit, she rose to captain status and grew to love the club: "They hold a dear place in my heart". Although Little helped Doncaster win the 2017–18 FA WSL 2 title, the impecunious fallen giants were refused a WSL license for the following season and consigned to the FA Women's National League.

References

External links
 Doncaster Rovers Belles player profile 
 
 

1984 births
Living people
English women's footballers
Women's association football defenders
Women's Super League players
Doncaster Rovers Belles L.F.C. players
Liverpool F.C. Women players
Sheffield United W.F.C. players
English women's basketball players
FA Women's National League players
People from Brixham
Notts County L.F.C. players